Racing Demon is a 1990 play by English playwright David Hare. Part of a trio of plays about British institutions, it focuses on the Church of England, and tackles issues such as gay ordination, and the role of evangelism in inner-city communities. The play debuted at the National Theatre.

Awards and nominations 
 Awards
 1990 Laurence Olivier Award for Best New Play
 Nominations
 1996 Tony Award for Best Play

References

External links
 
 

1990 plays
Laurence Olivier Award-winning plays
Plays by David Hare
West End plays